Kill Me Again is a 1989 American neo-noir thriller film directed by John Dahl, and starring Val Kilmer, Joanne Whalley and Michael Madsen.

Plot 
Violent criminal Vince (Michael Madsen) and his girlfriend and partner in crime Fay (Joanne Whalley-Kilmer) rob a pair of Las Vegas mobsters of a briefcase containing $850,000, killing one of them in the process. During their getaway the couple fight over what to do with the money and Fay loses. Deciding she has had enough of his controlling ways, Fay knocks Vince out and drives away with the money. 

Jack Andrews (Val Kilmer) is a widowed private investigator operating out of Reno. Guilt-ridden over his failure to save his wife from the lake car crash that killed her, he has accrued $10,000 in gambling debts and loan sharks are circling. Fay turns up at his office posing as a battered wife on the run from her abusive husband and offers him ten grand to fake her death so she can start a new life. Although he doubts Fay’s story, Jack feels sorry for her and agrees to help. 

Jack and Fay stage her death at a motel, though unbeknownst to Jack a matchbook with his name written in it is left in the room. Jack falls for Fay and agrees to meet her later at her motel, but after ditching the evidence-filled car in a lake he returns to find she has fled to Las Vegas, along with the remaining half of the money she owes him. 

The next day the cops arrest Jack for Fay’s murder but release him due to insufficient evidence. Meanwhile Vince reads about the murder in the paper and learns Jack’s name. Jack, believing Fay must have had a good reason to leave, prepares to follow her to Vegas, but is thwarted when the loan sharks return and take the rest of the advance she gave him. Shortly after, he is visited by Vince, who attacks him and demands to know where Fay is. Jack outwits him and escapes, leaving for Vegas in his car. The mob learn from the loan sharks that Jack has their money, and resolve to kill him.
 
Jack reaches Vegas and finds out from his partner, Alan (Jon Gries), that Fay is staying at a hotel under an alias similar to the fake ID he gave her. Jack finds her gambling at the hotel casino’s craps table, though not before the pit boss spots the mob money she is using and calls the gangsters. Jack takes Fay to her room to get his money and sees the briefcase full of cash. Before he can find out what is really going on, a couple of mobsters barge in, looking for the money. When one of them prepares to kill them, Fay pulls a gun and shoots him dead while the other escapes. Jack and Fay flee in his car and Fay admits to him she stole the money from Vince after they stole it from the mob. Fay manages to persuade Jack she ran because she was afraid Vince would kill her. 

Jack and Fay drive to a lakeside motel where they make love. Although he admits he does not trust her, Jack suggests they go to Maine to start a new life together, and Fay agrees. The next morning they hear on the radio the police are seeking them for the murder of the mobster, who was part of a powerful crime family. ‘Kill me again,’ says Fay, suggesting they fake their own deaths to escape. Jack calls Alan to say goodbye, unwittingly revealing their location.
 
Jack and Fay take a boat onto the lake where he explains his plan: they’ll blow up the boat to make it appear they died in an accident, then swim to shore and retrieve the money from a drop off before fleeing to Maine. Meanwhile, Vince tortures Alan to find out Fay and Jack’s whereabouts before killing him.
 
Jack leaves a reluctant and untrusting Fay at the motel while he drives to the drop off to bury the money. He stops to buy supplies at the Arizona border, thinks about driving away with the money, but decides to stick to the plan. He buries the money and supplies on an Indian reservation and returns to the motel where he finds Fay tied up by a gun-toting Vince, who demands to know where the money is. Jack calls Vince’s bluff, knowing he can’t kill him if he wants to find the money. Vince threatens to kill Fay instead, but again Jack calls his bluff, much to Fay’s dismay. Jack proposes a deal: he’ll take Fay and half the money and let Vince know in two days where the rest is. Vince ties Jack up and shuts him in the closet so he can think over his offer, but instead proceeds to rape Fay. She grabs the gun and shoots Vince, and she and Jack escape. 

Their plan scuppered, Jack and Fay drive to the drop off to retrieve the money. Just as Jack digs up the case, Vince appears, alive and well, and Jack realises he has been tricked. Fay shoots him and he falls into the lake. She and Vince take the case and drive away in Jack’s car, only to find they too have been tricked: the case is empty. The cops appear and chase the couple to the border where they crash into a fuel tank, dying in the explosion. Jack, wounded but alive and in possession of the money, is rescued from the lake by a pair of Indians who drive him to safety.

Cast
 Val Kilmer as Jack Andrews
 Joanne Whalley-Kilmer as Fay Forrester
 Michael Madsen as Vince Miller
 Jon Gries as Alan Swayzie
 Pat Mulligan as Sammy
 Michael Sharrett as Tim, Motel Clerk
 Michael Greene as Lieutenant Hendrix

Reception

Critical response 
The film drew a mixed reception. Variety gave it a mostly positive review, stating: "The tale of a down-and-out detective and a seamy femme fatale is a thoroughly professional little entertainment. Time Out gave it a mostly negative review, complaining: "Derived from assorted Hitchcocks and noir classics, the tortuous storyline of writer-director Dahl's determinedly sordid thriller has its moments," but was critical of the three lead actors and concludes: "Setting its study of betrayal and deceit in and around the gambling towns of the Nevada desert, the film sporadically achieves a truly seedy atmosphere, but there are too many symbols, too many loose ends, and too many vaguely sensationalist scenes.

Box office 
The film was a failure at the box office, but it later achieved some success on home video.

See also 
 List of American films of 1989

References

External links 
 
 

1989 films
1989 directorial debut films
1989 thriller films
American independent films
American neo-noir films
American thriller films
Films directed by John Dahl
Films produced by Steve Golin
Films scored by William Olvis
Films shot in Nevada
Films with screenplays by John Dahl
Metro-Goldwyn-Mayer films
PolyGram Filmed Entertainment films
1980s English-language films
1980s American films